Oberea elegantula is a species of beetle in the family Cerambycidae. It was described by Hermann Julius Kolbe in 1894.

References

elegantula
Beetles described in 1894
Taxa named by Hermann Julius Kolbe